The 1907 Geneva Covenanters football team was an American football team that represented Geneva College as an independent during the 1907 college football season. Led by first-year head coach Arthur McKean, the team compiled a record of 4–5–2.

Schedule

References

Geneva
Geneva Golden Tornadoes football seasons
Geneva Covenanters football